Fabián Oscar Cancelarich (born 30 December 1965) is an Argentine former footballer who played as a goalkeeper.

Cancelarich started his club career in 1986 with Ferro Carril Oeste in the Primera Division Argentina. Cancelarich served as the reserve goalkeeper for Argentina during the 1990 FIFA World Cup. In 1991, he was part of the Argentina squad that won the Copa América. In 1992, he was transferred to Belgrano de Córdoba and in 1994 he played for Newell's Old Boys.

In 1995, Cancelarich moved to Colombia to play for Millonarios, but he soon returned to the Argentine primera with Huracán 1995-1996 and Platense 1997–1999.

In 1999, Cancelarich returned to Ferro, the club where he started his career, after this final spell in the Primera Cancelarich moved to 2nd division Central Córdoba in 2000. In 2002, Central Córdoba were relegated to the 3rd division, Cancelelarich stayed with the club until his retirement in 2004.

References

External links
 Argentine Primera statistics

1965 births
Living people
Footballers from Santa Fe, Argentina
Argentine footballers
Argentine people of Croatian descent
Argentine expatriate footballers
Association football goalkeepers
Expatriate footballers in Colombia
Argentine expatriate sportspeople in Colombia
Ferro Carril Oeste footballers
Club Atlético Belgrano footballers
Newell's Old Boys footballers
Millonarios F.C. players
Club Atlético Huracán footballers
Club Atlético Platense footballers
Central Córdoba de Rosario footballers
1990 FIFA World Cup players
1991 Copa América players
1992 King Fahd Cup players
FIFA Confederations Cup-winning players
Argentina international footballers
Footballers at the 1988 Summer Olympics
Olympic footballers of Argentina
Argentine Primera División players
Copa América-winning players
Pan American Games bronze medalists for Argentina
Medalists at the 1987 Pan American Games
Footballers at the 1987 Pan American Games
Pan American Games medalists in football